Hlavice is a municipality and village in Liberec District in the Liberec Region of the Czech Republic. It has about 200 inhabitants.

Administrative parts
Villages and hamlets of Doleček, Lesnovek and Vápno are administrative parts of Hlavice.

Geography
It lies in the Ralsko Uplands.

References

External links

Villages in Liberec District